The Positive Action campaign was a series of political protests and strikes in pre-independence Ghana; a political activism campaign. The campaign was launched by Kwame Nkrumah before his election by popular vote as the ruler of Gold Coast and then Prime Minister of Ghana after the independence. The Positive Action campaign was launched to fight imperialism through nonviolence and education of the people. However, when Nkrumah launched the campaign, riots erupted throughout the capital, Accra.

The campaign ended with Nkrumah's election and the transformation from British colony to independent nation, hence ending the decolonization process.

References

Nkrumaism
Political campaigns
General strikes in Africa
Politics of Ghana